Saffet Gurur Yazar (born 16 April 1987) is a Turkish professional footballer who currently plays as a centre back for Artvin Hopaspor.

References

1987 births
Living people
Turkish footballers
Turkey B international footballers
Karşıyaka S.K. footballers
Association football defenders